Zygmuntów may refer to:

Zygmuntów, Łowicz County in Łódź Voivodeship (central Poland)
Zygmuntów, Łódź East County in Łódź Voivodeship (central Poland)
Zygmuntów, Pabianice County in Łódź Voivodeship (central Poland)
Zygmuntów, Radomsko County in Łódź Voivodeship (central Poland)
Zygmuntów, Wieruszów County in Łódź Voivodeship (central Poland)
Zygmuntów, Lublin Voivodeship (east Poland)
Zygmuntów, Świętokrzyskie Voivodeship (south-central Poland)
Zygmuntów, Zygmuntów, Przysucha County in Masovian Voivodeship (east-central Poland)
Zygmuntów, Szydłowiec County in Masovian Voivodeship (east-central Poland)